DJMax Respect is a rhythm game developed by Rocky Studio and Neowiz MUCA and published by Neowiz Games. It was released for the PlayStation 4 in 2017, for Microsoft Windows in 2020, and Xbox One and Xbox Series XS in 2022 as part of ID@Xbox. In Japan, the game was published by Arc System Works. It is a reboot of and the latest installment in the DJMax rhythm game series.

A PC  port version called DJMax Respect V (styled as, DJMAX RESPECT/V) launched on December 19, 2019 through Steam Early Access, and was fully released on March 12, 2020. An Xbox version of V launched on July 7, 2022. Available across console version, Xbox Live Windows 10 version, and Xbox Cloud Gaming services. This also marks the first DJMax game to be released on an Xbox console.

Features
 The base game includes 107 songs from DJMax Portable and DJMax Portable 2, as well as 40 new songs produced for Respect. Respect V includes five more songs in the base game.
 187 songs from DJMax Portable Clazziquai Edition, DJMax Portable Black Square, DJMax Technika, DJMax Trilogy, DJMax Technika 2, DJMax Technika 3, DJMax Portable 3, DJMax Technika Tune, and DJMax Technika Q, as well as 70 all-new songs are released as downloadable content. See DLC for more information.
 All songs from DJMax Ray and the Tap Sonic spin-off game series (Tap Sonic, Tap Sonic Top, Tap Sonic World Champion and Tap Sonic Bold) are planned to be released for free, as part of the Ladder Mode season updates.
 All background animations from previous games have been updated and remastered to support a 1080p resolution at 60 frames per second.
 The scoring system has been overhauled to reflect that of Technika 2 and Technika 3. Each song has a base score of 300,000 points for the original PS4 version and 350,000 points for Respect V, the maximum score that can be achieved without utilizing the score multiplier derived from the Fever system.
 Online mode, in which two players can play against one another to aim for the highest scores. Each player can play different chart difficulties of the same song concurrently.
 In-game achievements have been implemented. The achievement system is used to unlock in-game content such as new songs, interface skins, online profile accessories, and artwork. Most PlayStation Network trophies, Steam achievements, and Xbox achievements for the game are tied to this system as well.

Removed features
 Certain types of Gear present in previous games, such as Max LP, Anti-Break, Shield and extended Fever multipliers, have been removed for balancing purposes due to the inclusion of online leaderboards.
 Note speed increase and lockdown with the activation of Fever has been removed.
 Auto Fever no longer has any negative effect on the score.

Game modes
DJMax Respect features 6 primary game modes.
 Arcade: The standard single-player mode in which the player selects three songs from a randomly generated list of purchased songs, including songs yet to be unlocked for the Freestyle mode.
 Freestyle: Free play mode in which the player can select any song from the list of all songs which have been unlocked for the mode. This mode features local competitive play for the first time in the series.
 Mission: A mode that requires the player to clear a predetermined set of songs with certain conditions, such as unusual effectors or meeting score or combo requirements.
 Online Battle: A multiplayer mode that allows the player to compete against another player from around the world via the internet. This mode requires a PlayStation Plus subscription.
 Ranking: Allows the player to view the rankings of players from around the world. Scores are automatically submitted to the online leaderboard during normal play as long as the player is connected to the internet.
 Collection: Allows the player to customize their profile, view their lifetime stats and completed achievements, and view unlocked extras such as artwork and music videos, similar to the "Lounge Room" in Portable 3.

Exclusive Respect V features
 New redesigned SC chart for play on keyboard with 8-10 keys.
 New game modes emphasizing on the online features:
 AIR Mode : Replacing the original PS4 version's ARCADE mode, players will be able to join sessions of continuous, random playlists, during which they can choose to play or simply watch other players play, as well as leave comments for players.
 OPEN Mode : An enhancement to the original PS4 version's ONLINE mode, up to 7 players can play against each other to aim for the highest scores.
 LADDER Mode : Two-player online competitive mode, where players compete against each other to climb up the tiers from Bronze to Grandmaster. Includes player tier leaderboard, pick-and-ban, and Clear Pass. The first season commenced on January 28, 2021.
 Crossplay enabled for Xbox One, Xbox Series X and Series S, Xbox Live Windows 10/11 client and Xbox Cloud Gaming.
 New exclusive songs, including K/DA from League of Legends, Marshmello, Porter Robinson, and much more.

Songs

New in DJMax Respect
As of March 2023, DJMax Respect in all versions features 178 new songs. These consist of 40 original songs in the base game, 17 original and licensed songs available via free updates, 69 original songs available via DLC, 2 new Extended Mix song unlocked via the link disc, 49 licensed songs available via collaboration DLC.

Exclusive to DJMax Respect V are 41 licensed songs. These include 5 songs as part of the base game, 27 original songs via collaboration DLC, and 9 remixed songs as part of collaboration DLC.

DJMax Original Songs

 Collaboration Songs

Additional content
Ever since its release, downloadable content packs have been added to DJMax Respect. Each pack contains new songs to play, note and gear skins, and main menu UI skins. Some of these packs include new original songs or licensed songs.

Legacy DLC Pack 
The Legacy DLC Pack contains collection of 187 songs from the all previous DJMax games before release of Respect, with BGA remastering to support 1080p resolution, and also included are new songs produced for Respect. Each DLC packs contains new 12 mission divided into 2 mission pack, in some DLC will have signature mission that came from the origin version of game, such as TB Mode that using DJMax Technika series mechanical game play or the Remix mode that based on 6.2 track from the original DJMax Portable 3.

V EXTENSION DLC Pack 
The V Extension DLC Pack contains collection of new 61 songs that produced for Respect. Unlike the Legacy DLC packs, the V Extension contains only 20 new songs per pack, as well as 12 new missions per pack (except for V Extension 2, it's contain 24 new mission in V EX 2 Mission and V Link Mission), UI and gear skins. Neowiz Games has confirmed that V Extension DLC will have 5 packs, and available for both Respect and Respect V.

Collaboration DLC Pack 
The Collaboration DLC pack contains new 78 licensed songs from the origin game, as well as 9 exclusive songs that produced for Respect V. Same as the Legacy DLC pack, in Collaboration DLC it will contains UI and Gear skin. Except for mission, in each DLCs wouldn't contain the new mission pack. But some of the collaboration songs can be play in V Link mission pack.

Since release of Nexon DLC, the Collaboration DLC in the future will not available for PS Respect due to the different development process, licensing problem, and the impact to release timeline that cause the DLCs can't be release for every three months. However, the Collaboration DLC will continue to be available for Xbox Respect V.

Reception

On its release, DJMax Respect was met with "generally favorable" reviews from critics, with an aggregate score of 85% for PlayStation 4 on Metacritic.

Anti-cheat criticism
The PC Steam, PC Xbox Live, and Xbox version of the game has been criticized for using XIGNCODE3, an anti-cheat software that forces games that use it to always be online, thus preventing offline play even when playing single player.

References

Note

External links
 Official website

2017 video games
Arc System Works games
Respect
Multiplayer and single-player video games
Multiplayer online games
Music video games
PlayStation 4 games
Turntable video games
Video game reboots
Video games developed in South Korea
Video games scored by Shinji Hosoe
Video games with downloadable content
Windows games